S. P. Balasubrahmanyam was an Indian playback singer, who was well known for his work in South Indian films. Having made his playback singing debut in 1966 through the Telugu film Sri Sri Sri Maryada Ramanna, he sang over 40,000 songs in multiple languages of India. He is the recipient of six National Film Awards, six Filmfare Awards South, and one Filmfare Award. Balasubrahmanyam was also a recipient of 25 Nandi Awards—Best Male Playback Singer, Best Music Director, Best Male Dubbing Artist, Special Jury Award, and Best Supporting Actor categories. He has also won four Tamil Nadu State Film Awards and three Karnataka State Film Awards.

The first of his National Awards came for his work in the 1979 musical film, Sankarabharanam. Two years later he entered the Hindi film industry through Ek Duuje Ke Liye (1981), winning the award for the second time. He also received a Filmfare nomination for Best Male Playback Singer for the film. In the subsequent years, he won the National Film Awards for Saagara Sangamam (1983) and Rudraveena (1988)—both Telugu films. In 1989, he received his first Filmfare Award for Maine Pyar Kiya. He won the first of his four South Filmfare Awards for Subha Sankalpam, a film that he produced. His first Filmfare Award in the playback singing category came for Sri Ramadasu (2006), followed by Mozhi (2007) and Aaptha Rakshaka (2010). Other honors for his singing career included Lata Mangeshkar Award, Sangeetha Ganga Award, Film Fans' Association Award. In addition, he was also honored with Padma Shri (2001) and Padma Bhushan (2011), Padma vibhushan (2021), the fourth, third and second highest civilian honors by the Government of India. Alongside his singing career, Balasubrahmanyam worked as an actor, music composer, voice actor, and film producer.

Civilian honours

Other honours

National Film Awards

Filmfare Awards

Filmfare Awards South

South Indian International Movie Awards

Nandi Awards
In 2012, he received the NTR National Award for his contributions to the Indian cinema.

Tamil Nadu State Film Awards

Karnataka State Film Awards

Other awards and honors

Film Fans' Association Award (Madras)—oldest association in the country—received 20 times
 "Sangeetha Ganga Award", for his contribution to Kannada Film Industry in 2001
 "Lata Mangeshkar Award" in 1999
 "Sangeeta Ganga award" in 2001
 Delhi Telugu Academy's Rashtriya Vikas Shiromani Award (Lifetime) in 2002
 "Dr. Bezawada Gopala Reddy Award", given during a function in Nellore in 2002
 "Lifetime Achievement Award" conferred during "TVS Victor Aalaapana Music Awards" function for the years 2001 and 2002, in Hyderabad in 2002
 "Swaralaya-Kairali-Yesudas" award in 2002
 "Rani Rao Balasaraswathi Award" in 2003
 "Arya Bhata Prasasthi" in 2003
 "Kalasri Award" in 2004
 "Best Playback Singer" from Maa TV, Cinemaa awards in 2004
 "Viswa Ganayogi" From Karnataka Chief Minister in 2005
 Raja-Lakshmi Award from Sri Raja-Lakshmi Foundation, Chennai in 2006
 "Best Playback Singer" from Vijay TV, Reliance Mobile Vijay Awards in 2006
 "Tansen Award" Sur Singar Sanjad (Bombay) for best classical rendition of a song from Tere Payal Mere Geeth composed by Naushad Sab
 "Best Playback Singer" from Santosham awards for the film Sri Ramadasu in 2006
 "Lifetime Achievement Award", presented by Santhosham awards in 2007
 "Basavashree Award" from Karnataka Government
 "A.P. Cinegoers Association Award for Best Singer" for Sri Bhagavatham (serial on ETV) in 2007
 "Sangeetha Saagra" from Kanchi Kamakoti Peetham, Kanchipuram in 2008
 "Karnataka Rajyotsava Prasasthi" from the Government of Karnataka on 1 November 2008
 Innumerable awards from magazines and associations fostering films
 "Lifetime Achievement Award" presented by Telugu Association of North America (TANA) in Chicago session in 2009
 "P. Susheela trust National Award" Presented on 29 November 2009
 "Kopparapu Kavula Puraskaram" from Kopparapu Kala Peetam, Visakhapatnam on 9 September 2009
 "Lifetime Achievement Award", presented by Raagalaya Music Awards (27 February 2010 at Shanmukhanad Hall, Mumbai) in 2010
 Ghantasala Award in 2010
 Great son of the soil award from Justice Rajesh Tandon, Chairperson Cyber appellate tribunal New Delhi at All India conference of intellectuals in Hyderabad on Saturday in 2010
 ANR Lifetime achievement award from Akkineni Nageswara Rao in 2010
 "Pride Of Indian Cinema" from Yuvakalavauhini, Hyderabad on 30 June 2010
 "Best playback Singer" award from "Gemini Tv Ugadi awards" 2010 for the serial "Kotha Bangaram"
 Vamsee Film awards 2010 "Best Playback Singer (male)" for the film "Mestry"
 "BIG Kannada Entertainment Awards" for the most entertaining "TV host of the year" and the programme "Yede Tumbhi Haaduvenu" being declared as the most entertaining reality show of the year
 "Santosham awards 2010" Best Playback Singer (male) for the film "Mahatma"
 "Lifetime Achievement Award" - 2011 presented by Lux Sandal CineMAA Awards on 19 June 2011 in Hyderabad
 "Isai Thendral" - Title conferred to S P Balasubrahmanyam by Botswana Tamil Cultural Association - Executive Committee (2011-2012) on 14 April 2012 in recognition towards his continuous dedication, contribution and commitment to the Indian Music and Film Industry
 The Hyderabad Times Film Awards 2011- Best Singer male for Jagadanandakaraka - Sri Ramarajyam
 "Chevalier Sivaji Ganesan Award for Excellence in Indian Cinema" given by STAR Vijay in 2011
 "Harivarasanam Award" by Government of Kerala in 2015
 "Tamizhan Award 2017" by Pudhiya Thalaimurai
6th Dakshinamurthy Nadapuraskaram, 2019, Kerala. Peringottukara Devasthanam, Thrissur
"Sri Krishna - Yesudas Award 2018" by Sri Krishna Swara Raaga Sravanthi, Hyderabad at Ravindra Bharathi, Hyderabad, Telangana

References

S. P. Balasubrahmanyam
Awards and nominations received by